Yang Jong-min (born October 9, 1990 in Seoul) is a South Korean infielder who currently plays for the LG Twins of the KBO League. He joined the Lotte Giants in the draft in 2009 (2nd draft 2nd round). He played in the Lotte Giants from 2009 to 2013. He transferred baseball team from Lotte Giants to Doosan Bears in 2014.

References

External links 

 Career statistics and player information from Korea Baseball Organization
 Yang Jong-min at Doosan Bears Baseball Club

Living people
1990 births
South Korean baseball players
KBO League pitchers
Doosan Bears players